Vernonia brazzavillensis is a species of perennial plant in the family Asteraceae. It is endemic to The Republic of the Congo and the Democratic Republic of Congo.

References

brazzavillensis
Flora of the Republic of the Congo
Flora of the Democratic Republic of the Congo
Taxa named by André Aubréville